Protopanaxadiol (PPD) is an organic compound characterizing a group of ginsenosides. It is a dammarane-type tetracyclic terpene sapogenin found in ginseng (Panax ginseng) and in notoginseng (Panax pseudoginseng).

Just what protopanaxadiol's metabolites do inside the human body is still unclear. One study suggests it has rapid, non-genomic effects on endothelial cells, binding to the glucocorticoid and oestrogen beta receptors. The study also showed an increase of intracellular calcium ion concentration.

See also
 Protopanaxatriol

References

Triterpenes
Triols
Steroids